Quatsino Provincial Park is a provincial park in British Columbia, Canada, located on Quatsino Sound on northern Vancouver Island.

History
The park was established July 12, 1995.

Conservation
This undeveloped park protects some of the largest old-growth trees, some small lakes, Koprino Harbour, which is a sheltered inlet, and the Koprino River estuary, which is noted for its critical fish-rearing and waterfowl habitat. The park also protects nesting and feeding habitat that is used by a high concentration of bald eagles. Black bears are very common in Quatsino Provincial Park, as are coastal black-tailed deer and cougars.

Recreation
The following recreational activities are available: backcountry camping and hiking, kayaking and canoeing, fishing and hunting. Quatsino Provincial Park is primarily a marine-access recreational park.

Location
It is accessible by rough logging roads or by kayaks. Quatsino is on a popular kayaking route.

Size

See also
List of British Columbia Provincial Parks
List of Canadian provincial parks

References

External links
Quatsino Provincial Park

Provincial parks of British Columbia
Quatsino Sound region
1995 establishments in British Columbia
Protected areas established in 1995